The Champion Shot is a 1932 German comedy film directed by Franz Seitz and starring Weiß Ferdl, Max Adalbert and Hugo Schrader.

The film's sets were designed by the art director Ludwig Reiber. It was shot at the Bavaria Studios in Munich.

Synopsis
The owner of a store in a small Bavarian town is put out when a new shop is opened by an arrival from Berlin who also claims to be a better marksmen than the local. The two men entertain a rivalry in both business and shooting prowess. To complicate matters further, their children fall in love.

Cast
 Weiß Ferdl as Siebzehnrübel
 Max Adalbert as Funke Sr.
 Hugo Schrader as Funke Jr.
 Gretl Theimer as Anni Siebzehnrübel
 Berthe Ostyn as Lola
 Paula Menari as Sophie Siebzehnrübel
 Joe Stöckel as Schützenvorstand

References

Bibliography 
 Waldman, Harry. Nazi Films in America, 1933–1942. McFarland, 2008.

External links 
 

1932 films
Films of the Weimar Republic
German comedy films
1932 comedy films
1930s German-language films
Films directed by Franz Seitz
Bavaria Film films
Films shot at Bavaria Studios
German black-and-white films
1930s German films